The 1924 Drake Bulldogs football team was an American football team that represented Drake University as a member of the Missouri Valley Conference (MVC) during the 1924 college football season. In its fourth season under head coach Ossie Solem, the team compiled a 5–2–1 record (3–1–1 against MVC opponents), placed third in the MVC, and outscored its opponents by a total of 106 to 56.

Schedule

References

Drake
Drake Bulldogs football seasons
Drake Bulldogs football